Manuchehr Bahmani (born 9 December 1951) is an Iranian boxer. He competed in the men's bantamweight event at the 1972 Summer Olympics. At the 1972 Summer Olympics, he lost to Wang Chee-yen of Chinese Taipei.

References

1951 births
Living people
Iranian male boxers
Olympic boxers of Iran
Boxers at the 1972 Summer Olympics
Place of birth missing (living people)
Bantamweight boxers